Dance Deewane 1 is the first season of the Indian dance reality television series Dance Deewane that premiered on 2 June 2018 on Colors TV. This season was hosted by Arjun Bijlani. The season was won by Alok Shaw.

Judges 
The following are the three judges of the season:

Madhuri Dixit
Tushar Kalia
Shashank Khaitan

Contestants 
Top 20 contestants were chosen, 6 from 1st and 3rd generation and 8 from 2nd generation.

 1st Generation: Kids
 2nd Generation: Youth
 3rd Generation: Seniors

 Indicates the contestant is male.
 Indicates the contestant is female.

Challengers

Summary

 The contestant is from 1st Generation.
 The contestant is from 2nd Generation.
 The contestant is from 3rd Generation.

 The contestant was the Ultimate Winner.
 The contestant was the Winner of their Generation.
 The contestants were Finalists and eliminated during the final.
 The contestant was safe by getting all 3 Plays.
 The contestant was saved by getting 2 Plays.
 The contestant was got only 1 Play and was in bottom.
 The contestant was in the bottom. 
 The contestant was Eliminated.
 The contestant was injured and had to leave the competition.

Guests

References

Indian dance television shows